Kristof Wilke (born  17 April 1985 in Radolfzell) is a German former representative rower. He is a three time world champion and an Olympic gold medallist. 

At the 2012 Summer Olympics in London, he stroked the German men's eight crew that won the gold medal in the eights competition. Later that year each member of the crew was awarded the Silbernes Lorbeerblatt (Silver Laurel Leaf), Germany's highest sports award, for the achievement.

References

 

1985 births
Living people
Rowers at the 2008 Summer Olympics
Rowers at the 2012 Summer Olympics
Olympic rowers of Germany
Olympic gold medalists for Germany
Olympic medalists in rowing
Medalists at the 2012 Summer Olympics
World Rowing Championships medalists for Germany
German male rowers
People from Radolfzell
Sportspeople from Freiburg (region)
Recipients of the Silver Laurel Leaf